The Yakima Herald-Republic is a newspaper published in Yakima, Washington, and distributed throughout Yakima, Kittitas and Klickitat counties as well as northwest Benton County. It is Washington state's seventh-largest daily newspaper. The newspaper traces its roots to the late 19th century. 

Harte-Hanks bought the Herald-Republic in 1972 from the Robertson family. Harte-Hanks sold the paper to an affiliate of MediaNews Group in 1986. It is now part of The Seattle Times Company, which purchased the paper in 1991.

The newspaper was printed in Yakima until 2021, when The Seattle Times Company announced it would sell the Herald-Republics headquarters and printing plant. The newspaper will instead be printed in Walla Walla by the Walla Walla Union-Bulletin.

References

Newspapers published in Washington (state)
Mass media in Yakima, Washington